HTD may refer to:
 Heatherdale railway station, Victoria, Australia, station code
 Hospital for Tropical Diseases, in London, England